Airporter Limited is a bus company based in Derry, Northern Ireland. It provides a shuttle service between Derry and Belfast International and Belfast City Airports. In July 2009, the company announced that its fleet would provide the first free wifi service on-board any coach fleet in Northern Ireland. In 2010, the company announced a service from Derry to Belfast city centre. As of 2019, it had a fleet of 21 buses, operated by approximately 30 drivers.

References

1996 establishments in Northern Ireland
Bus operators in Northern Ireland
Companies based in Derry (city)
Transport companies established in 1996